John Nimmo Whyte (7 May 1921 – 17 October 1998) was a Scottish professional footballer who played for Bedlay, Falkirk, Bradford City, and Wigan Athletic.

Whyte spent one season at Wigan, making 26 appearances during the 1957–58 season of the Lancashire Combination.

References

External links 

1921 births
1998 deaths
Bradford City A.F.C. players
Falkirk F.C. players
Scottish Football League players
Scottish footballers
English Football League players
Wigan Athletic F.C. players
Association football fullbacks
Footballers from West Lothian